The 1982 Ottawa Rough Riders finished the season in 3rd place in the East Division with a 5–11 record. After winning the East-Semi Final playoff game against the Hamilton Tiger-Cats, the Riders lost to the Toronto Argonauts in the East Final. This season marked the last time an Ottawa football franchise won a playoff game until 2015, when the second-year Redblacks won two playoff games.

Offseason

CFL Draft

Preseason

Regular season

Standings

Schedule

Postseason

Awards and honours

CFL All-Stars

RB – Alvin "Skip" Walker
OG – Val Belcher
OG – Rudy Phillips

Eastern All-Stars

RB – Alvin "Skip" Walker
OG – Val Belcher
OG – Rudy Phillips
DT – Gary Dulin
DE – Greg Marshall
DB – Carl Brazley
K – Gerry Organ

References

Ottawa Rough Riders seasons
1982 Canadian Football League season by team